KOLC (97.3 FM) is a commercial radio station located in Carson City, Nevada, broadcasting to the Reno, Nevada, Carson City and Lake Tahoe areas.  KOLC, known as Ten Country,  broadcasts a country music format.  Its studios are located on Plumb Lane in South Reno, and its transmitter is located on McClellan Peak northeast of Carson City, Nevada.

History
97.3 MHz in Carson City went on air in 1972 as KPTL-FM. It was owned by William Cody Kelly and two years later was transferred to the Kelly Broadcasting Company, which gave its initials to the station's next callsign, KKBC.

On August 30, 2011, KZTQ (moved to 93.7 FM Sun Valley, NV) changed their call letters to KSGG and began stunting towards a new format, landing at Rhythmic CHR as "Swag 97.3." This marks a return to the format on this signal, as it was the original format of KWNZ during the 1990s and early 2000s prior to relocating to the 93.7 signal in 2004.

On March 18, 2013, KSGG began stunting, running a loop directing listeners to KSGG 1230 AM and FM translator K285EQ 104.9 FM.

On March 20, 2013, KSGG changed their call letters to KOLC. On March 25, 2013, at 12 Noon, KOLC launched a modern adult contemporary format, branded as "Little City 97.3".

On March 4, 2014, KOLC began stunting again, redirecting listeners to FM translator K223AL 92.5 FM in South Lake Tahoe (relays KLCA-HD3), which picked up the "Little City" modern AC format. The next day (March 5), KOLC ended stunting and launched a country music format, branded as "Ten Country @ 97.3".  Rudy Michaels has been the morning show host since shortly after the transition to the country music format.

References

External links

OLC
Radio stations established in 1972